West Bengal is the state with the second highest population density in India. The state is dotted with several large and medium cities and towns. Historically, the main source of income of the people of West Bengal has been farming, and, as a consequence, the state previously had a large rural population skew. At the turn of the 20th century, however, the role of industry in West Bengal increased substantially, leading to a population move into urban areas.

In 1947, when India gained independence, the erstwhile British Indian province of Bengal was divided into two parts: the eastern region formed East Pakistan, which became Bangladesh in 1971, and the western part joined India as the state of West Bengal. Scores of refugees from the eastern part came to West Bengal, leading to the start of new urban areas, and contributing to the congestion of already established cities like Kolkata.

Current scenario
According to the 2011 Census of India, 128 cities and towns in West Bengal are classified into the following categories:

Municipal Corporation

Municipality

Notified Area

Major cities

List of urban areas (district-wise)

See also
 List of cities in West Bengal by population
 List of metropolitan area in West Bengal

Notes

References